Mario Golf: Advance Tour is a role-playing video game-styled sports game developed by Camelot Software Planning and published by Nintendo for the Game Boy Advance in 2004. The game is the sequel to the Game Boy Color version of Mario Golf and the Game Boy Advance counterpart of Mario Golf: Toadstool Tour.

Story mode

Overworld
Advance Tour features an overworld map, where the player can walk around and interact with different courses and objects. On the overworld are the four golfing "clubs" (Marion, Palms, Dunes, and Links) which hold tournaments. The player must play in these tournaments to prove themselves to be an "ultimate golfer", and earn the right to golf with Mario. There are also side courses, as well as the Custom Club Shop, where a metalsmith will make the player special clubs if they give him a Custom Ticket.

Courses

In each of the four clubs available in Mario Golf: Advance Tour, there are three places of interest: the golf course, the practice area, and the student lodging. The golf course is accessed by entering the tourneys or by playing a practice round. The practice area allows the players to hone their skills by doing various mini-games, as well as play a match against the course leader. Each practice area also features a secret challenge that allows the player to obtain useful items. The student lodging area is only accessible in the Marion course, where Neil and Ella live. One can talk to their doubles partner here, as well as save their game.

Characters

At the beginning of the game, the player must choose between one of two characters, Neil or Ella, and play as that character for the rest of the game, with the other character as their doubles partner. Neil and Ella have different strengths: Neil has stronger hitting and a slight draw, while Ella has more precise hitting and a slight fade. By progressing through the game and completing its various elements, the player can gain experience to distribute among the two characters to enhance both their drive as well as their hitting capabilities. As a character levels up, they gain stat points to improve their abilities.

Multiplayer
Advance Tour features four multiplayer modes. In the "Without Game Link" mode, two to four players take turns playing on one Game Boy Advance. They can choose a player from the unlocked list of players, pick clubs, and then pick a gameplay mode. Other than the previous mentioned features, this is the same as standard free-play mode. In the "With Game Link" mode, each player can select from their own list of characters and clubs, but courses must be mutually unlocked. Otherwise, this is the same as the Without Game Link mode. The Wireless Adapter mode only shows up when the Wireless Adapter is attached to the Game Boy Advance. Otherwise, this is the same as With Game Link mode. In the Club Exchange mode, two players can trade the clubs which they have earned throughout the game via a Game Link Cable or a Wireless Adapter. In the Get Clubs mode, one can receive exclusive Special clubsets (up to 16) from a Wonder Spot using a Wireless Adapter. However, this mode was never used.

Development and release
Advance Tour was revealed in late 2003, and created largely by the same team who made Mario Golf: Toadstool Tour for the Nintendo GameCube. Initially shipped on April 22, 2004 in Japan, the game was also released on June 22, 2004, and September 17, 2004 for North America and Europe respectively. The game also was bundled in Japan with a Wireless Adapter, to go along with the Pokémon releases at the time.

The game was designed by Shugo Takahashi and Hiroyuki Takahashi, and directed by Yasuhiro Taguchi, all of whom have contributed to the Golden Sun series, which had graphical elements that were reused in this game and Mario Tennis: Power Tour.

In 2014, the game was re-released on the Wii U Virtual Console on August (PAL) and September (Japan and North America).

Reception

Since its release, Advance Tour received "favorable" reviews according to the review aggregation website Metacritic.

IGN hailed Advance Tour as "one of the best golfing games ever", bestowing the game with an Editors' Choice Award, GameSpy said "aside from the quirks in graphics and music, there's almost nothing wrong with Mario Golf: Advance Tour", and Game Informer concluded that in Advance Tour "handheld golf has never been as much fun."

The RPG elements have also been praised, with 1UP saying "[the] simple act of leveling up is addictive in itself" and according to EGM "all the extraneous questing, character building, and item collecting just works."

Notes

References

External links
Official North American Mario Golf: Advance Tour website at the Internet Archive
Official Japanese Mario Golf: Advance Tour website 
Mario Golf: Advance Tour at Camelot.com 
Mario Golf: Advance Tour at Nintendo.com (archives of the original at the Internet Archive)

2004 video games
Camelot Software Planning games
Game Boy Advance games
Golf video games
Video game sequels
Mario Golf
Video games developed in Japan
Video games scored by Motoi Sakuraba
Virtual Console games
Virtual Console games for Wii U
Multiplayer and single-player video games
Games with GameCube-GBA connectivity